Hitman 2 may refer to the following titles in the Hitman franchise:

Hitman 2: Silent Assassin, a 2002 game developed by IO Interactive
Hitman 2 (2018 video game), a 2018 game developed by IO Interactive
Hitman: Agent 47, the second film adaptation of the series

See also
Hitman (disambiguation)